Pinkas is a surname of eastern Ashkenazi origin, and may refer to:

 Alon Pinkas (born 1961), Israeli diplomat
 David-Zvi Pinkas (1895–1952), Israeli politician
 Israel Pinkas (born 1935), Israeli poet
 Itai Pinkas (born 1973), Israeli politician
 Sally Pinkas (21st century), Israeli pianist

References

See also
 

Jewish surnames